The Risk railway station is a closed railway station on the North Coast railway line in New South Wales, Australia. The station opened in 1930 and closed in 1974.

References

Disused regional railway stations in New South Wales
Railway stations in Australia opened in 1930
Railway stations closed in 1974
1974 disestablishments in Australia